Colbusa is a genus of moths of the family Noctuidae erected by Francis Walker in 1865. There are three species:
 Colbusa discrepans (Karsch 1896)
 Colbusa euclidica Walker 1865
 Colbusa restricta Hampson 1918

References

Catocalinae